Bathytoma badifasciata is a species of sea snail, a marine gastropod mollusk in the family Borsoniidae.

Distribution
This marine species occurs in the Southwestern Pacific. and the Solomon Islands.

Description

References

 Puillandre N., Sysoev A.V., Olivera B.M., Couloux A. & Bouchet P. (2010) Loss of planktotrophy and speciation: geographical fragmentation in the deep-water gastropod genus Bathytoma (Gastropoda, Conoidea) in the western Pacific. Systematics and Biodiversity 8(3): 371-394

External links
 

badifasciata
Gastropods described in 2010